Fajah Hanna Nicole Lourens (born July 3, 1981) is a Dutch actress, model and disc jockey.

Career 
She played the role of Yasmin Fuentes in the Dutch soap opera Goede Tijden, Slechte Tijden for three seasons (2002–2005). Lourens had her film debut in Stiletto's (2011) and had a role in Amsterdam Heavy (2011).

She participated in So You Wanna Be a Popstar (2007), finishing tenth. Lourens was a participant in the third season of the Dutch version of 71 Degrees North, but the show was cancelled when host Ernst-Paul Hasselbach died during shooting. Currently, Fajah Lourens competes in Expeditie Robinson.

Lourens began deejaying in 2011, playing at clubs including Jimmy Woo, Panama, Beachclub Vroeger, Escape, Het Paard, Holland Casino, Cinema, and Off Corso. She is also active as a music producer.

In January 2011, it was announced that Lourens was cast in the action film Amsterdam Heavy by director Michael Wright.

Filmography

References

External links 
 Official website
 

1981 births
Living people
21st-century Dutch actresses
Actresses from Amsterdam
Dutch DJs
Dutch female models
Dutch people of Curaçao descent
Women DJs
21st-century women musicians